Lahore District is a district in the Punjab province of Pakistan, mainly consisting of the city of Lahore. Before 1976 district Lahore has 3 tehsils. Tehsil Lahore, Tehsil Kasur and Tehsil Chunian. But in 1976 Kasur is become district and separate from Lahore District.

Administration 
The district is administratively subdivided into five tehsils.

Demography 
At the time of the 2017 census, the district's population was 11,119,985, with 5,813,987 males and 5,303,982 females. It was entirely urban. The literacy rate was 77.08%. Muslims were 94.71% of the population while Christians were 5.14% of the population.

At the time of the 2017 census, 80.94% of the population spoke Punjabi, 12.62% Urdu and 2.71% Pashto as their first language.

Education 
According to Pakistan District Education Rankings, a report by Alif Ailaan, Lahore is ranked nationally at 32 with a score of 69.2 and learning score of 53.93. Lahore ranks nationally at number 1 in terms of readiness score, with a score of 93.51. According to PEC assessments, Lahore ranks last out of all districts of Punjab in both class 5 and class 8.

Science labs in schools are either not available or have inadequate instruments which also affects quality. The school infrastructure score of Lahore is 91.32, ranking it 29th nationally. Still few schools in a major district like Lahore have open air or dangerous classrooms.

Issues mainly reported in TaleemDo! app from Lahore are that students want to study in private schools, as they are better than government schools but can not afford the fee. A communication gap between the teachers and the students was also reported and a few reported some facilities problems in their school.

See also
 Districts of Pakistan
 Lahore
 Punjab

References

https://dsal.uchicago.edu/reference/gazetteer/pager.html?objectid=DS405.1.I34_V16_104.gif

External links
Lahore District

 
Districts of Punjab, Pakistan